Zeïna Sahelí (born September 13, 1983) is a Senegalese former swimmer, who specialized in sprint freestyle events. Saheli competed for Senegal in the women's 100 m freestyle at the 2000 Summer Olympics in Sydney. She received a ticket from FINA, under a Universality program, in an entry time of 1:07.33. She challenged seven other swimmers in heat one, including 15-year-olds Maria Awori of Kenya Nathalie Lee Baw of Mauritius. Storming from sixth at the final turn, Saheli held off a sprint battle from Uganda's Supra Singhal to hit the wall by 0.78 seconds in 1:07.37. Saheli failed to advance into the  semifinals, as she placed fifty-first overall in the prelims.

References

External links 
 
 

1983 births
Living people
Senegalese female swimmers
Olympic swimmers of Senegal
Swimmers at the 2000 Summer Olympics
Senegalese female freestyle swimmers
Sportspeople from Dakar